Jérémy Maison (born 21 July 1993) is a French former professional road cyclist, who competed professionally between 2016 and 2019 for the  and  teams. He was named in the startlist for the 2017 Vuelta a España.

Major results

2014
 1st Tour du Lot-et-Garonne
 1st Paris–Auxerre
 1st Tour de Côte d'Or
 8th Paris–Troyes
 9th Overall Tour de l'Avenir
2015
 1st Stage 4 Tour du Jura
 3rd Overall Ronde de l'Isard
1st Stage 2
 4th Overall Tour des Pays de Savoie
 7th Coppa dei Laghi-Trofeo Almar
2018
 3rd Overall Tour de Savoie Mont-Blanc

Grand Tour general classification results timeline

References

External links

 
 

1993 births
Living people
French male cyclists
Sportspeople from Yonne
Cyclists from Bourgogne-Franche-Comté
21st-century French people
20th-century French people